Teh-Li Tsui served as a member of the executive board of the Boy Scouts of China.

In 1990, Tsui was awarded the 210th Bronze Wolf, the only distinction of the World Organization of the Scout Movement, awarded by the World Scout Committee for exceptional services to world Scouting.

References

External links

Recipients of the Bronze Wolf Award
Year of birth missing
Scouting in Taiwan